Tambovsky District  is an administrative and municipal district (raion), one of the twenty in Amur Oblast, Russia. Its administrative center is the rural locality (a selo) of Tambovka. Population:  25,049 (2002 Census);  The population of Tambovka accounts for 33.6% of the district's total population.

References

Notes

Sources

Districts of Amur Oblast